Dulia may refer to:

 Dulia (Latin), Latin term for veneration
 Douleia, Greek term for veneration
 Dulia, Democratic Republic of the Congo, a village